The 2008 Asian Beach Games or ABG 2008 (Pesta Olahraga Pantai Asia Dua Ribu Delapan), officially the 1st Asian Beach Games and commonly as Bali 2008 (Bali Dua Ribu Delapan), the inaugural Asian Beach Games, was held in Bali, Indonesia, from 18 to 26 October 2008. The opening ceremony was held in the Garuda Wisnu Kencana Cultural Park in Nusa Dua.

Organisation

Bidding process 
There was no bidding process for Bali to host the games. Although six other countries showed an interest, Bali was chosen by acclamation.

It was the second time that Indonesia had hosted an Asia-level multi-sport event, after Jakarta held the 1962 Asian Games.

Logo 
The official logo of the games represents the water element that embodies the sporting event.

The shining sun comes from the emblem of the Olympic Council of Asia (OCA) and represents its vital role in Asia's sport development and the spreading energy created by the solidarity of the OCA. The selection of the light and deep-blue effects represents the color of Balinese waters. The two vertical lines represent two pura (Balinese Hindu temple), an image of the gate to a Balinese house of worship which signifies the ultimate hospitality of the Bali society in honouring and welcoming people from all over Asia. The two big waves represent the commitment as well as the enthusiasm of the host city to holding the first Asian Beach Games.

The letters "BALI 2008" are in red to show the spirit of sportsmanship and the typeface selection emphasizes the pride of all athletes competing in Bali.

Mascot 

The official mascot of the First Asian Beach Games was the Bali starling (Leucopsar rothschildi), locally known as "jalak Bali", the official mascot of Bali and a bird species endemic to the island.

The bird symbolizes Bali with all its uniqueness and serves as a reminder that the bird, like Bali, is beautiful, yet sacred. It is therefore apt that the official mascot of Bali was chosen as the official mascot for the first Bali Asian Beach Games.

Venues
There were five venues for this games.

Sponsorship 
Sponsors include Swatch (official timekeeper and information system provider), Carisbrook (official wardrobe), Pertamina (Indonesian state-owned oil company), Panasonic and Samsung.

Broadcasting 

A joint venture between Host Broadcast Services and IMG Media named the International Games Broadcast Services (IGBS) served as the games' host broadcaster. This was the first sporting event broadcast by the company as it previously broadcast the Doha 2006 Asian Games under the name Doha Asian Games Broadcast Services (DAGBS).

Torch relay 
The Bali Asian Beach Games Torch Relay started on 8 October 2008 at Mrapen in Grobogan, Central Java, famous for its eternal flame. The flame was lit with the aid of natural gas.

From Mrapen, the torch was carried to Semarang, the capital city of Central Java, where the torch was carried to the Governor Office by Indonesia's famous sprinter, Suryo Agung Wibowo.

On 9 October 2008, the torch arrived in Jakarta. On the next day, the torch was paraded from the City Hall to Indonesia's Minister of Youth and Sport Office, and finally arrived at the Istana Merdeka to be given to President Susilo Bambang Yudhoyono.

On 10 October 2008, the torch headed to Bali for a nine-day inland tour across ten regions (one city and nine regencies).

More than 500 people (45 per district) were involved in the torch relay as torch bearers. They came from the sports world as local, national and international athletes, coaches and officials. More than 2,000 people participated in the parade.

The journey was a showcase of Indonesian culture to international audiences, especially Balinese traditional art, dance and music.

Highlights 

The opening ceremony was held in the Garuda Wisnu Kencana, a great monumental cultural park in Nusa Dua, the most luxurious region in Bali.

President Yudhoyono officially opened the games when the torch reached the Garuda Wisnu Kencana.

The ceremony highlighted Indonesian cultural arts and included international performers such as Mark Lazarro from India and Christian Bautista from the Philippines, as well as famous Indonesian singers and composers, such as Reza Artamevia, Andre Hehanusa and Erwin Gutawa.

Andre Hehanusa, Christian Bautista and Mark Lazarro sang "To Be One" while the Indonesian female singer, Reza Artamevia, performed the games anthem, "Together We Inspire the World".

About 41 country leaders and several very important persons, including members of the British Royal Family and the Qatari Royal Family, attended the opening ceremony.

The 2008 Asian Beach Games were closed by Indonesia's Vice President, Jusuf Kalla, on 26 October 2008.

A countdown clock cost Rp800 million (US$87,521) was situated at Lumintang Field.

Sports

Participating nations 
41 Asian countries participated in the games.

Calendar

Medal table

References

External links 
 Bali 2008 – 1st Asian Beach Games – Olympic Council of Asia official site
 
 The Big Picture – The Boston Globe

 
Asian Beach Games
Asian Beach Games
A
Asian Beach Games
2008 in Asian sport
Multi-sport events in Indonesia
Sport in Bali